Géraldine Ruckstuhl (born 24 February 1998) is a Swiss heptathlete. She competed in the women's heptathlon at the 2017 World Championships in Athletics.

References

External links

1998 births
Living people
Swiss heptathletes
World Athletics Championships athletes for Switzerland
Place of birth missing (living people)